This is a list of the past, present, planned or abandoned guided bus systems or bus rapid transit schemes in the United Kingdom, including segregated busways. Not included are bus priority schemes, bus lanes or local authority bus company quality contracts that do not involve guidance, significant segregation from the public highway or other bus rapid transit features. The UK does not have any implementations or proposals for rubber tyred trams such as Translohr or Bombardier Guided Light Transit.

Present systems

 Belfast, Northern Ireland, Glider (Belfast) operated by Translink
 Ipswich, Suffolk, Ipswich Rapid Transit operated by First Eastern Counties, branded Superroute 66, incorporating a 200-m section of guided busway
 Kesgrave - Grange Farm, opened 1995
regauged in 2005 for larger double-deck buses
 1971 - Phase 1 complete It was the world's first BRT system in 1971.
 1977 - Phase 2 completeRedditch, Worcestershire, Matchborough Circular, operated by Red Diamond and First Midlands, an unguided network built as part of the new town extension of Redditch. The system carries over 1.5 million passenger journeys per annum.London East London Transit, unguided with sections of segregated running: first phase (Ilford to Barking Riverside) completed on February 2010. Phase 2 (Beacontree Heath to Dagenham Dock) opened in 2013. Phase 3 (Little Heath  to Barking Riverside) opened in 2017.Thames Gateway, Fastrack, unguided with sections of segregated running, opened in phases in concert with planned local development. Operated by Arriva Southern Counties using standard buses,
 Route A - Dartford - Bluewater, opened June 2007
 Route B - Dartford - Gravesend, opened March 2006LeedsLeeds Superbus, corridors with sections of guided busway, operated by First Leeds
 A61 Scott Hall Road and King Lane, four sections, opened 1995
 A64 York Road / B6159 (formerly A63) Selby Road, three sections, opened 2001
 Bradford Manchester Road Quality Bus Initiative Bradford end, including  of guided busway
 Southgate Avenue, opened August 2003.
 Fastway, opened December 2004.
 Tyne & WearCentrelink was an infrastructure project including an exclusive busway on the south bank of the River Tyne, for bendy bus services from Gateshead to the Metrocentre, operated by Go North East. In 2020, bendy bus services are long gone and the Centrelink project turned out to be a bus lane along the river with no priorities.
 Luton, BedfordshireThe Luton to Dunstable Busway runs between Luton Airport and Houghton Regis via Dunstable following the Dunstable branch line, which closed in 1989, running parallel to the A505 (Dunstable Road) and A5065 (Hatters Way). t runs for 6.1 miles, of which 4.8 is guided track with a maximum speed of 50 mph. The £91 million scheme opened on 25 September 2013.
 Cambridgeshire Guided Busway, a BRT corridor incorporating "just over 16 miles" of guided busway, using the alignments of the former Cambridge and Huntingdon railway and also of the Varsity Line.
 St Ives Park & Ride - Milton Road, Cambridge: construction begun January 2007; was due to open in February 2009 but heavily delayed. The service finally opened to traffic on Sunday 7 August 2011. 
 Cambridge railway station - Trumpington Park & Ride: opened 7 August 2011.South East Hampshire Bus Rapid Transit, unguided, between Gosport and Fareham, Hampshire, constructed by Hampshire County Council using the route of the former Gosport to Fareham railway line to reduce congestion on the parallel A32. The scheme was proposed following the collapse of the light rail scheme using the same route and funding was approved in July 2009 for the £20m scheme. It opened in April 2012 with services provided by First Hampshire & Dorset using specially branded "Eclipse" buses.Leigh-Salford-Manchester Bus Rapid Transit, from Leigh and Atherton to Manchester via Tyldesley and Ellenbrook. The 29-stop scheme extends a total of 22 km; and makes partial use of a former railway line to form a  guided busway together with pedestrian, cycle lane and bridleway between Leigh, Tyldesley, and Ellenbrook relieving heavy congestion. It then joins the East Lancashire Road running in a dedicated a bus lane. A Park and Ride site has been constructed where the road reaches the M60 motorway and buses continue through Salford and into Manchester city centre along  of segregated bus lanes; continuing through the centre along Oxford Road to the University of Manchester and Manchester Royal Infirmary. The route is 80% segregated from highway along its length. Costs were £68m for the guided busway and £122m for the total project. Road junction works began in late-2011 and the full busway opened on 3 April 2016. It forms part of the wider Manchester Quality Bus Corridor (Manchester QBC) and Cross City Bus network.Sheffield Bus Rapid Transit North running a 9 km route between Sheffield Interchange and Rotherham Interchange, that opened in September 2016. The route designated 'X1 Steel Link' runs every 10 minutes at peak.  Total cost was £29.8m, most of which was for the construction of an 800m road link under the Tinsley Viaduct at Meadowhall.  Otherwise the service runs over a similar specification route to those provided for stopping buses.Bristol: Bristol City Council, in conjunction with the West of England Partnership, approved three MetroBus routes which consists of Ashton Vale to Bristol Temple Meads station (AVTM) and two routes from the North Fringe towards Bristol City Centre and  Hengrove Park respectively; and opened in May 2018. Only the Ashton Vale to Temple Meads route runs along a guided busway track; on the other two routes the BRT services share buslanes with stopping buses - except for a newbuild junction onto the M32 motorway, which is reserved for Metrobus services only.Leeds, Swansea and YorkFTR bendy bus route unguided, operated by First Leeds from 2007-2012, after the end of FTR services the buses were rebranded Hyperlink and redeployed alongside Yorks on the 72 route between Leeds and Bradford before being replaced by conventional double deckers in 2016.
FTR bendy bus route Between Acomb and University of York, from 2006-2012 operated by First York.
FTR bendy bus route Swansea, South Wales, unguided, operated by First Cymru branded Swansea Metro. Services commenced in September 2009 from Morriston Hospital to Singleton Hospital via Morriston, Swansea railway station, the Kingsway, Swansea bus station, the Civic Centre and Swansea University. Withdrawn in August 2015 and replaced with standard single deck buses, later in 2015 the two way bus lane was replaced with a conventional one way system in response to high-profile accidents, the 'bendy buses' were returned to service in 2016 as a student shuttle between Swansea University campuses.

Past systems

 Birmingham. Tracline 65 was an upgraded route with the first guided busway in the UK. There was a 600-metre section of guideway in Erdington. It opened in 1984 and closed in 1987.
 Edinburgh, Edinburgh Fastlink operated by Lothian Buses. Originally called WEBS, the West Edinburgh Bus Scheme, a group of bus priority improvements that included a  section of guided busway.
 Stenhouse - Broomhouse, opened in December 2004, designed to be used for Line 2 of the Edinburgh Tram Network. In January 2009 it closed to enable conversion to tramway. The two bus services using the guideway were re-routed.

Future systems
Under constructionBelfast: Since 2008 Belfast has been formally exploring the idea of a rapid-transit system. This quickly settled down to be a high-quality bus-based system, with modern vehicles with a tram-like feel with off-vehicle ticketing and fast journey times that hinge on the use of a dedicated traffic lane that is not used by general traffic. The ultimate ambition seems to be for routes running from the city centre to the north, east, south and west with an additional line to Titanic Quarter. The network is in the middle of being constructed and is planned to be opened by 2017/18. This system opened in 2018 as a BRT system running on normal roads.

Planned or proposedWest Midlands Sprint. A proposed limited stop service with dedicated bus lanes, with a total of 7 routes to be operational by 2026.
 Birmingham - Solihull - Birmingham Airport
 Birmingham - Perry Barr - Walsall
 Birmingham - Langley - Sutton Coldfield
 Birmingham - Bearwood - Dudley
 Birmingham - Bearwood - Halesowen
 Birmingham - Selly Oak - Northfield - Longbridge
 Hall Green - Solihull - Birmingham Airport - Birmingham InterchangeCambridge There are two busway projects being planned by the GCP (Greater Cambridge Partnership).
 Cambourne - Cambridge busway connecting Cambourne 12 km west of Cambridge to the city.
 CSET (Cambridge South East Transport), connecting Babraham to the existing southern busway via the Biomedical Campus.Coventry Sprint. A proposed application of the FTR (bus) over a  route, 34% segregated
 Nuneaton - Coventry - Kenilworth, route consultation ongoingGlasgow, Clyde Fastlink, along the north bank of the River Clyde, with segregated running for the majority of its length outside the city centre. It has been approved by Scottish ministers and is expected to be ready for the 2014 Commonwealth Games. 
 Glasgow City Centre - Glasgow Harbour with the majority of the route segregated.
 London West London Transit, being considered following the abandonment of plans for the West London Tram in August 2007
 Cardiff South Wales Metro includes plans to install BRT systems along the main roads in Cardiff.

Abandoned proposals
 Leeds, following refusal of funding the proposed Leeds Supertram, a replacement system was proposed by the government, which included a three-line  trolleybus network. 38% would run on guideways or on bus lanes.
 London 
Millennium Transit, a segregated busway intended to link the Millennium Dome with Charlton and Greenwich railway stations, part of which was to include a  section of electronic guidance. Intended to be operational when the Dome opened, the electronic guidance technology was abandoned following concerns that neither the system nor the driver was in a position to avoid sudden obstacles. The busway was later replaced by a dual carriageway due to safety concerns.
 Greenwich Waterfront Transit, planned for completion by 2011, abandoned in 2008 due to cancellation of Thames Gateway Bridge.
 Stoke-on-Trent''' Streetcar, primarily to link the railway station to the city centre, but would have also linked the rest of the city's six towns and neighbouring Newcastle-under-Lyme and Kidsgrove. Major destinations included both universities, the hospital and both major football stadia.

See also
 Rapid transit in the United Kingdom
 List of bus rapid transit systems

References

External links

United Kingdom
 
Guided bus
Bus-related lists